The Round House is a Grade II* listed late Georgian elliptical stuccoed villa located on Broxhill Road in Havering-atte-Bower, London. The house was built between 1792 and 1794 by John Plaw for William Sheldon. The house is open as part of the Open House London weekend.

The building houses a residential recording studio called The Hideaway, created by Imogen Heap in 2006.

References

External links

Grade II* listed buildings in the London Borough of Havering
Grade II* listed houses in London
Houses in the London Borough of Havering
Recording studios in London